is a Japanese former Nippon Professional Baseball infielder.

References 

1961 births
Living people
Baseball people from Ōita Prefecture 
Japanese baseball players
Nippon Professional Baseball infielders
Yomiuri Giants players
Japanese baseball coaches
Nippon Professional Baseball coaches